al-Arian is an Arab village in northern Israel. Located in Wadi Ara, it falls under the jurisdiction of Menashe Regional Council.

See also
Arab localities in Israel

References

External links
Survey of Western Palestine, Map 8: IAA, Wikimedia commons

Arab villages in Israel
Triangle (Israel)
Populated places in Haifa District